What Is Philosophy? is a 2016 book by Giorgio Agamben in which the author provides a "complex, rich investigation into the nature of philosophy".

See also
Metaphilosophy

References

2016 non-fiction books
Books about metaphilosophy
Books by Giorgio Agamben
Metaphysics literature
Stanford University Press books